Kim Hye-yeong (born 17 February 1961) is a South Korean sports shooter. She competed in the women's 25 metre pistol event at the 1984 Summer Olympics.

References

1961 births
Living people
South Korean female sport shooters
Olympic shooters of South Korea
Shooters at the 1984 Summer Olympics
Place of birth missing (living people)
Shooters at the 1986 Asian Games
Shooters at the 1990 Asian Games
Asian Games medalists in shooting
Asian Games silver medalists for South Korea
Asian Games bronze medalists for South Korea
Medalists at the 1986 Asian Games
Medalists at the 1990 Asian Games
20th-century South Korean women
21st-century South Korean women